Siano is a surname. Notable people with the surname include:

Joe Siano, American vocalist 
Michele Siano (born 1991), Italian footballer
Nicky Siano (born 1955), American DJ
Tony Siano (1907–1986), American football player

See also
Sano (surname)